Karisma Evi Tiarani (born 19 January 2001) is an Indonesian Paralympic sprinter. She was finished at the 4th rank in the 100 metres T63 at 2020 Summer Paralympics.

Early career
Born with Type of Impairment Leg length difference, Tiarani took up Para athletics in 2014 at the Central Java Student Education and Training Centre in Surakarta, Indonesia, together with her coach Slamet Widodo where She was invited to attend a Para sports tryout. She contracted flu soon after arriving at the 2019 World Para Athletics Championships in Dubai, United Arab Emirates. Despite the illness disrupting her preparations for the event, she went on to win gold in the T63 100m. She is also Winning three medals, including gold in the T42/63 100m, at the 2018 Asian Para Games in Indonesia. She received a sporting achievement award from the Indonesian Ministry of Youth and Sports for her achievements at international events in 2018/19.

Awards and nominations

References

External links
 
 

2001 births
Living people
Sportspeople from Central Java
Indonesian female sprinters
Athletes (track and field) at the 2020 Summer Paralympics
Paralympic athletes of Indonesia
21st-century Indonesian women